Canis Majoris can refer to any of a number of stars which, as seen from Earth, reside within the Canis Major constellation, including:

 Sirius (Alpha Canis Majoris), the brightest star in the terrestrial sky
 VY Canis Majoris, one of the largest known stars in the known universe
 Murzim (Beta Canis Majoris)
 Muliphen (Gamma CMa)
 Wezen (Delta CMa)
 Adhara (Epsilon CMa)
 Furud (Zeta CMa)
 Aludra (Eta CMa).